Whale Cove is a small cove, approximately one-third of a mile (0.5 km) in diameter, located on the Pacific Coast of Oregon in the United States, approximately 1.4 mi (2.3 km) south of the city of Depoe Bay.  The cove is located at approximately 44 deg 44 min N latitude.

The ocean portion of the cove is protected as a marine reserve, and land portions of the cove are protected as parts of Rocky Creek State Scenic Viewpoint and Oregon Islands National Wildlife Refuge.

Drake theory

In 1978, British amateur historian Bob Ward proposed that Whale Cove was the location where Francis Drake spent the summer of 1579 during his circumnavigation of the globe by sea. The exact location of Drake's landing spot, at which he claimed a portion of the west coast of North America as "New Albion", has been claimed to be identified by proponents of more than twenty sites. The officially recognized Drake landing site is at the Drakes Bay Historic and Archaeological District National Landmark in northern California on the coast of Marin County.

Ward proposed Whale Cove as the actual spot of Drake's landing based on its similarity to a 16th-century map made by Jodocus Hondius. Ward theorized that Drake may have conspired with Queen Elizabeth I to mislead the Spanish about the true location of the cove to keep the Spanish from discovering Puget Sound, which Ward believes that Drake thought was the Northwest Passage.

One longstanding puzzling feature of the Hondius map is the small island on the peninsula protecting the cove. According to Ward, a narrow strip of the peninsula protecting Whale Cove "has a strip through which water flows at high tide" turning 80% of the peninsula into an island.

Navigation

Whale Cove is not considered a usable bay by any size of vessel.

References

Further reading
Samuel Bawlf, The Secret Voyage of Sir Francis Drake, Penguin Books, 

Coves of the United States
Bays of Oregon
Pre-statehood history of Oregon
Oregon Coast
Lakes of Lincoln County, Oregon